Franziska Hennes (born 21 April 1992 in Homburg) is a professional squash player who represents Germany. She reached a career-high world ranking of World No. 105 in May 2014. In 2013, 2014, 2017 and 2018 she won the German Nationals.

References

External links 

1992 births
Living people
German female squash players
Competitors at the 2013 World Games
People from Homburg, Saarland
Sportspeople from Saarland